Cottam may refer to:

Places 
Cottam, East Riding of Yorkshire, England
Cottam, Lancashire, England
Cottam, Nottinghamshire, England
Cottam, Ontario, Canada

People with the surname Cottam
 Andy Cottam (born 1973), English cricketer
 Bob Cottam (born 1944), English cricketer
 Brad Cottam (born 1984), American football player
 Francis Cottam (1900–1987), English cricketer
 Harold Cottam (1891–1984), British wireless operator on the RMS Carpathia during the Titanic disaster
 John Cottam (1867–1897), Australian cricketer
 John Cottam (footballer) (born 1950), English footballer
 Michael Cottam (born 1966), English cricketer
 Nicholas Cottam (born 1951), British Army officer
 S. E. Cottam (1863–1943), English poet and priest
 Thomas Cottam (1549–1582), English Catholic priest and martyr

Other uses 
 Cottam railway station, a disused station in Nottinghamshire, England
 Cottam power stations, coal and gas powered electricity generating stations in Nottinghamshire, England
 RAF Cottam, a World War II station in the East Riding of Yorkshire

See also
 Coatham, a district of Redcar, North Yorkshire
 Coatham Mundeville, a village near Darlington, County Durham
 Cotham (disambiguation)